Juan Pablo Paz (born 4 January 1995) is an Argentine tennis player.

Paz has a career high ATP singles ranking of 284 achieved on 8 May 2017. He also has a career high ATP doubles ranking of 390 achieved on 27 February 2017.

Paz made his ATP main draw debut at the 2017 Ecuador Open Quito in the doubles draw partnering Gonzalo Escobar.

ATP Challenger and ITF Futures/World Tennis Tour finals

Singles: 22 (7–15)

Doubles: 31 (16–15)

Notes

References

External links

1995 births
Living people
Argentine male tennis players
People from Quilmes
Sportspeople from Buenos Aires Province
21st-century Argentine people